Peter Esdale is a retired ice hockey head coach who had been in charge at both American International and Ferris State.

Career
Esdale began his coaching career in the late-1960s and quickly rose to become the head coach at American International by 1972. After only two seasons, however, he moved on to other coaching options. After a short stint at the University of Alberta where he won three national titles, Esdale eventually landed in Big Rapids as an assistant to Dick Bertrand. After Bertrand resigned mid-way through the 1985–86 season, Esdale was named as the interim head coach and finished out the season with a losing but respectable record. After the season, despite a vote of confidence from the AD, Esdale was not retained by the Bulldogs and instead was named as head coach for the Spokane Chiefs. A year later Esdale announced his retirement from coaching to become a sales rep for Procter & Gamble. Esdale could not stay away from coaching for long, however, and was soon back with the  Alberta Golden Bears, first as an assistant and eventually as head coach.

Head coaching record

† Midseason replacement

References

External links

Year of birth missing (living people)
Living people
Canadian ice hockey coaches
Canadian ice hockey players
American International Yellow Jackets men's ice hockey coaches
Ferris State Bulldogs men's ice hockey coaches
Spokane Chiefs coaches
Ice hockey people from Edmonton